House of Seghat-ol -Eslam is a historical house in Tabriz, Iran. It is now  a museum dedicated to Seqat-ol-Eslam Tabrizi who was a local reformist of the Qajar era.

See also 
 Seqat-ol-Eslam Tabrizi
 The Amir Nezam House
 Constitutional Revolution House of Tabriz
 Haidarzadeh house

External links 
  Editorial Board, East Azarbaijan Geography, Iranian Ministry of Education, 2000

Buildings of the Qajar period
Museums in Tabriz
Seghat ol Islam
Architecture in Iran